Guntars Krasts (born 16 October 1957) is a Latvian politician, former Prime Minister, and former Member of the European Parliament for the single Latvia constituency. Born in Riga, he was the Minister of Economy of Latvia from December 1995 to August 1997, Prime Minister of Latvia from August 1997 to November 1998, and the Deputy Prime Minister from November 1998 to June 1999. Krasts was a member of Saeima, the Latvian parliament, from June 1999 until being elected to the European Parliament in 2004.

Guntars Krasts in the European institutions
Guntars Krasts was elected in the 2004 Euroelections as MEP for the single Latvia constituency as a member of For Fatherland and Freedom/LNNK. He sits with the Union for a Europe of Nations group (UEN). He left For Fatherland and Freedom/LNNK in February 2008 but joined no other party. As of 31 March 2009, his European Parliament profile shows no national party membership.

On 28 March 2008, Libertas Latvia gave a press conference in which Krasts was named as the head of the Libertas Latvia list. The list would total eight candidates to contend the nine seats assigned to the single Latvia constituency. In the EP elections of 2009, the Libertas.lv list fell short of entering parliament, receiving 4,3% of the vote.

Later activities
After the elections, Krasts distanced himself from politics, working in a United Nations and European Union project in Moldova as a government advisor for state reform and EU integration for the Government of Moldova. In 2018, it was announced that he had joined the Latvian Association of Regions.

See also
 Krasts cabinet

References 

1957 births
Living people
Politicians from Riga
For Fatherland and Freedom/LNNK politicians
Latvian Association of Regions politicians
Prime Ministers of Latvia
Ministers of Economics of Latvia
Deputies of the 7th Saeima
Deputies of the 8th Saeima
For Fatherland and Freedom/LNNK MEPs
MEPs for Latvia 2004–2009
University of Latvia alumni